The Wizard of Oz is a 1925 American silent fantasy-adventure comedy film directed by Larry Semon, who also performs in the lead role as a Kansas farmhand and later in the story disguised as the Scarecrow.

This production, which is the only completed 1920s adaptation of L. Frank Baum's 1900 novel The Wonderful Wizard of Oz, costars Dorothy Dwan as Dorothy, Oliver Hardy as the Tin Woodman in a portion of the film, and Curtis McHenry briefly disguised as a less "cowardly" Lion than in the 1939 Metro-Goldwyn-Mayer version of Baum's work, The Wizard of Oz (1939 film).

In the film, Dorothy Gale (Dorothy Dwan), a Kansas farm girl is told a story about Uncle Henry (Frank Alexander) not being her uncle after all. Suddenly a tornado blows into Kansas and whisks the farmhands and Dorothy to Oz, where Dorothy is discovered as Princess Dorothea by Kruel (Josef Swickard). The farmhands are disguised as a scarecrow, a tin man and lion.

Plot
A toy-maker (Semon) reads L. Frank Baum's book to his granddaughter. In the story the Land of Oz is ruled by Prime Minister Kruel (Josef Swickard), aided by Ambassador Wikked (Otto Lederer), Lady Vishuss (Virginia Pearson), and the Wizard (Charles Murray), a "medicine-show hokum hustler". When the discontented people, led by Prince Kynd (Bryant Washburn), demand the return of the princess, who disappeared while a baby many years before, so she can be crowned their rightful ruler, Kruel has the Wizard distract them with a parlor trick: making a female impersonator (Frederick Ko Vert) appear out of a seemingly empty basket. Kruel sends Wikked on a mission.

Meanwhile, in Kansas, Dorothy (Dorothy Dwan) lives on a farm with her relatives. While Aunt Em (Mary Carr) is a kind and caring woman, Uncle Henry (Frank Alexander) is an obese man with a short temper who shows little love for his niece. He also abuses his farmhands: Snowball (credited to G. Howe Black, a stage name for Spencer Bell, who frequently appeared in Semon's films) and Hardy's and Semon's unnamed characters. The latter two are both in love with Dorothy, who favors Hardy's character. Aunt Em reveals to Dorothy that she was placed on their doorstep as a baby, along with an envelope and instructions that it be opened only when she turned 18.

On her 18th birthday, however, Wikked and his minions arrive at the farm by biplane and demand the envelope. When Uncle Henry refuses to hand it over, Wikked suborns Hardy's character by promising him wealth and Dorothy. Wikked then has Dorothy tied to a rope and raised high up a tower; his men start a fire underneath the rope. Hardy's character finds the note, but Semon's character takes it and saves Dorothy, only to have Wikked and his men capture them all at gunpoint.

Then a tornado suddenly strikes. Dorothy, the two rivals for her affection, and Uncle Henry take shelter inside a small wooden shed, which is—along with Snowball—carried aloft by the violent wind and soon deposited in the Land of Oz. Dorothy finally reads the contents of the envelope; it declares that she is Princess Dorothea, the rightful ruler of Oz. Thwarted, Kruel blames the farmhands for kidnapping her and orders the Wizard to transform them into something else, such as monkeys, which he is of course unable to do. Chased by Kruel's soldiers, Semon's character disguises himself as a scarecrow, while Hardy improvises a costume from the pile of tin in which he is hiding. They are still eventually captured by the soldiers. During their trial, the Tin Man accuses his fellow farmhands of kidnapping Dorothy. Kynd has the Scarecrow and Snowball put in the dungeon.

Kruel makes the Tin Man "Knight of the Garter" and Uncle Henry the "Prince of Whales". Wikked suggests he retain his power by marrying Dorothy. The Wizard then helps the two prisoners escape by giving Snowball a lion costume, which he uses to scare away the guards. Though the Scarecrow manages to reach Dorothy to warn her against Kruel, he is chased back down into the dungeon by the Tin Man, and ends up getting trapped inside a lion cage (with real lions) for a while. He and Snowball finally escape.

When Kynd finds Kruel trying to force Dorothy to marry him, they engage in a sword fight. When Kruel's henchmen intervene and help disarm Kynd, the Scarecrow saves Dorothy and Kynd. Defeated, Kruel claims that he took Dorothy to Kansas in order to protect her from court factions out to harm her, but she orders that he be taken away.

The Scarecrow is heart-broken to discover that Dorothy has fallen for Prince Kynd. He then flees up a tower from the Tin Man, who tries to blast him with a cannon. Snowball flies a biplane overhead, and the Scarecrow manages to grab a rope ladder dangling underneath it. However, the ladder breaks and he falls. The scene shifts abruptly back to the little girl, who had fallen asleep. She wakes up and leaves. The grandfather reads from the book that Dorothy marries Prince Kynd and they live happily ever after.

Cast
 Dorothy Dwan as Dorothy
 Larry Semon as a farmhand / the Scarecrow
 Oliver N. Hardy as another farmhand / the Tin Man
 Curtis McHenry as Snowball / the Cowardly Lion. (although credited in film as "G. Howe Black")
 Charles Murray as the Wizard
 Bryant Washburn as Prince Kynd
 Josef Swickard as Prime Minister Kruel
 Mary Carr as Aunt Em
 Frank Alexander as Uncle Henry
 Virginia Pearson as Lady Vishuss,
 Otto Lederer as Ambassador Wikked
 Frederick Ko Vert as the Phantom of the Basket
 The names of William Hauber and William Dinus also appear in the cast credits at the beginning of the film, but their characters are not cited.
 Some identify the Cowardly Lion's player as Curtis McHenry.

Production
The film departs radically from the novel upon which it is based, introducing new characters and exploits. Along with a completely different plot, the film is all set in a world that is only barely recognizable as the Land of Oz from the books. The film focuses mainly on Semon's character, who is analogous to Ray Bolger's Scarecrow character in the 1939 version. Another major departure from the book and the later film is that the Scarecrow, the Tin Man, and the Cowardly Lion are not actually characters, but are only disguises donned by the three farm hands after they are swept into Oz by a tornado. Dorothy in the film is also identified as being 18 years old, an appreciably older character than in the 1939 production, where Judy Garland's Dorothy is presented as an adolescent, a girl just beginning to enter her teen years. In an even more radical departure from the original book, the Tin Man is portrayed as a villain who betrays Dorothy, Scarecrow, and the Lion.

Some elements of the narrative have their roots in earlier adaptations of The Wizard of Oz. For example, Prime Minister Kruel has a predecessor in King Krewl, the antagonist in the 1914 film His Majesty, the Scarecrow of Oz. The note explaining Princess Dorothea's true heritage is signed "Pastoria", a name used for the exiled King of Oz in the 1902 stage version of The Wizard of Oz and for the father of Princess Ozma in Baum's 1904 book The Marvelous Land of Oz, as well as in his later works relating to Oz.

Lead actress Dorothy Dwan was Larry Semon's fiancée at the time of its filming. The couple would marry upon the feature's release and remain together until Semon's death just three years later in 1928. "L. Frank Baum, Jr." is also given top billing in the film's credits for cowriting the script. That credit refers to Frank Joslyn Baum, Baum's eldest son. Although his actual contribution to the screenplay is doubted by Baum scholar Michael Patrick Hearn, the son may have been involved in the business-related aspects of the production.

Reception
According to Ben Mankiewicz, who hosted a televised presentation of the film by Turner Classic Movies in 2018, the production was poorly received by critics and audiences in 1925. However, Mordaunt Hall of The New York Times gave the film a favorable review that year, writing "'The Wizard of Oz' can boast of being the type of rough and tumble farce that sends bright faces from the theatre." The Chicago-based publication Photoplay, one of the first American fan magazines devoted to the film industry, highly recommended the adventure comedy to its large readership in 1925, warning "If you don’t take your children to see this, they will never forgive you." The magazine then adds in its review, "Nothing quite so funny as Larry Semon in the role of the Scarecrow has happened in a long time...and the biggest grouch in the world will get a laugh out of Larry's antics with the lions."

In yet another review in 1925, the influential New York trade publication Variety describes the film as a "corking picture" for children even though the widely read paper did find the film's overall structure chaotic, some of its scenes far too long or unnecessary, and Semon's use of slapstick gags "hoaked up" and excessive:
Variety sums up The Wizard of Oz in its review by noting that "the laughs are there" and predicts the film would be a box office success for Chadwick Pictures and theater owners, especially outside large metropolitan areas. "In small towns and in smaller cities", the paper states, "the picture should mop up." Yet, contrary to Variety’s forecast of financial success for the production, Chadwick Pictures went bankrupt during the film's promotion and release, and many theaters did not even receive their reels to show the motion picture. Semon himself never recovered from his own heavy personal investments in the "screen disaster". In fact, he too filed for bankruptcy in March 1928; and when he died at the age of 39 later that year—just three years after the release of The Wizard of Oz—Variety attributed "ceaseless worry" about his dire financial circumstances as a contributing factor to Semon's early death.

Television
The film was first broadcast in 1931 by television station W2XCD of Passaic, New Jersey, owned by the DeForest Radio Company, serialized over the nights of June 8, 9 and 10.

Home media
Since this version of The Wizard of Oz is in the public domain, many home-media releases of the film are available in assorted formats, including Betamax, VHS, Laserdisc, CED, DVD, HD DVD and Blu-ray. It is also available for streaming on the Internet Archive as well as on YouTube. The film is included as well as an extra feature, along with earlier silent films based on the Oz stories, on some home-media releases of MGM's 1939 version of The Wizard of Oz, beginning with the 2005 three-disc "Collector's Edition" of the film.

Music
 The film's premiere in 1925 featured original music orchestrated by Louis La Rondelle, conducted by Harry F. Silverman, featuring Julius K. Johnson at the piano.
 Many home video releases of the film lacked any score, as with many early releases of public-domain silent films.
 The version with an organ score performed by Rosa Rio was made in 1986 for inclusion in the Video Yesteryear edition.
 In 1996, a new version was made. This version was included in all of the home media releases of the film, beginning with the L. Frank Baum Silent Film Collection of Oz, released by American Home Entertainment on November 26, 1996, and features a score performed by Mark Glassman and Steffen Presley and a narration performed by Jacqueline Lovell.
 In 2005, yet another version was made, which features original music composed and arranged by Robert Israel and performed by the Robert Israel Orchestra (Europe), and is included in all of the home media releases of the 1939 film, beginning with the 2005 three-disc Collector's Edition DVD of the film.

See also
 Adaptations of The Wizard of Oz

References

External links

 
 
 
 
 
 The Bad Movie Report—Oz Silent Films

1925 films
1925 adventure films
1920s fantasy films
American black-and-white films
American coming-of-age films
American silent feature films
1920s children's fantasy films
American fantasy comedy films
American fantasy adventure films
Films based on The Wizard of Oz
Films directed by Larry Semon
Films set in Kansas
Surviving American silent films
1925 comedy films
1920s American films
Silent American comedy films
Silent adventure films
Silent American fantasy films